Adedayo Isaac Omolafe (18 April 1964 – 16 August 2021) was a Nigerian politician and legislator of the Nigerian National Assembly. He represented Akure North/South federal constituency in the Nigerian House of Representatives. He hailed from Akure in the southwestern part of Nigeria. He was a member of the Peoples Democratic Party and was also known by the moniker, Expensive.

Political career 
He served as the councillor Representing Ward 2 (Ijomu/Obanla), Akure Local Government between 1995 and 1996 and as the supervisory councillor for health in Akure South Local Government in 2000.

In 2009, he served as the chairman of Akure South Local Government under the governorship of Olusegun Agagu.

He was elected into the 9th session of the Nigerian Federal House of Representatives to represent Akure North/South constituency.

Omolafe was referred to as a philanthropist for his programmes geared towards community empowerment. He was honored for his contributions to society by the Nigerian society for engineers.

Death 
He died on Monday 16 August 2021 at Federal Medical Centre Owo.

References 

Nigerian politicians
People from Ondo State
2021 deaths
1964 births